My Sweet is a 2001 Spanish drama film directed by Jesús Mora. It was entered into the 23rd Moscow International Film Festival.

Cast
 Aitana Sánchez-Gijón as Ángela
 Bárbara Goenaga as Laura
 Santiago Ramos as Fermín
 Unax Ugalde as Óscar
 Arianna Puello as Jamila (as Arianna Puello 'Ari')
 Marco Cocci as Scratch
 Francesc Orella as Antonio
 Marcial Álvarez as Negro
 Bruno Bergonzini as Rata
 Boris Ruiz as José
 Fermí Reixach as Mario
 Isak Férriz as Willy

References

External links
 

2001 films
2001 drama films
Spanish drama films
2000s Spanish-language films
2000s Spanish films